Camp Robert L. Cole is a Boy Scout camp in the Tahoe National Forest in Northern California. It is on the south shore of Lake Sterling on leased land owned by the U.S. Forest Service and Pacific Gas & Electric Company .

Facilities 

The camp has two main buildings, plus a rangers cabin and a bike shop. The largest building contains a kitchen and food storage room on the first floor and bunk rooms on the second. The second building contains camp offices, a staff dining hall, and a dispensary on the first floor, and bunk rooms on the second floor. There is a pit toilet building, a shower building with eight shower stalls and a handicap accessible shower and toilet.

The camp has 16 large tent campsites, an archery range, a rifle and shotgun range, and campfire bowl. Open fires are not permitted. Only propane and butane lanterns and stoves are permitted in the camp.

Location

The camp is located at an altitude of 7,200 feet (2,200 m)  in the Tahoe National Forest next to Lake Sterling. The surrounding alpine forest contains 13 nearby lakes and streams supporting trout. There are so many lakes that some of them are just assigned numbers.

Former summer camp program 

The Golden Empire and prior councils offered summer camp at Camp Cole for many years. In 2015 the camp was open for three weeks from July 20 to August 8. The cost was $250.

When used as a Boy Scout summer camp, the program featured a six-day,  trek through the nearby mountains known as the Cole Trek.  Cole also offered Mountain Biking Treks, Rock Climbing, Mountain Man Program, and a unique Build Your Own Program week. A trading post provided snacks and merit badge supplies during camp. Meals during summer camp were served cafeteria style.

The waterfront program included swimming, canoeing, snorkeling, small boats, and board-sailing. The camp provided a limited number of Scouts with a series of activities that helped them satisfy many of the requirements for First Class rank.

Due to ongoing poor road conditions and the gift of land for a new camp  at a lower elevation, the council stopped providing a summer camp program at Camp Cole in 2015.

Current use  

The camp is currently used by five Northern California stakes of the Church of Jesus Christ of Latter-day Saints for their Young Men summer camp program during three weeks in July or August.

It is also used for one week each summer by the White Stag Sierra leadership camp. They provide ongoing leadership development for youth 11-18. Attendees have come from as far as Mexico and China. Participants take part in challenging games and exercises designed to stimulate learning about leadership.

Hiking 

The trail system usually follows watercourses and is prone to be wet after rain, requiring detours. The trails cross many many marsh areas as well. There are two marked trail systems, red and blue, accessible by crossing the dam, and staying to the right around a helipad. Both connect to Mossy Pond located to the northeast. The red trail is to the west (13E01A) and  the blue trail veers east. From the dam the red trail goes left while the blue trail continues along the lake. The blue or east trail is easier, more popular, and is usually well marked. It is also usually wetter than the more challenging red trail to the west.

The former Glacial Trails Council offered a patch and certificate to Scouts who completed a  hike connecting Fordyce, Meadow, Paradise, Baltimore, and Lola Montez Lakes.

Three Boy Scout councils collaboratively offer a patch for a Tri-Trek Trail that connects three Boy Scout camps: Camp Pahatsi (Golden Empire Council at Kilborne Lake), Camp Robert Cole (Golden Empire Council at Lake Sterling), and Camp Marin-Sierra (at Chubb Lake). Hikers can begin the  loop at any of the three camps. From Camp Pahatis to Camp Cole is 12 miles; Camp Cole to Marin-Sierra is 25 miles; and Marin-Sierra to Camp Pahatsi is 21 miles. Boy Scouts can complete any section of the trek to qualify for the patch.

History 

In 1924 the Buttes Area Council and the Mount Lassen Area Council were split from the former Sacramento Area Council. In 1952 and 1953 Buttes Area Council Executive Alden Barber worked closely with volunteers to identify a new summer camp site in the Sierra Nevada mountains near a lake. They found Lake Sterling, a Pacific Gas & Electric reservoir,  and discovered that it was within  of 13 other small lakes suitable for back country treks. They opened the Glacial Trails Scout Ranch at Sterling Lake in 1954.

The council built a permanent kitchen in 1957, and after a severe winter storm severely damaged it, were forced to rebuild it in 1958. It was reconstructed once again in 1970, during which volunteers also built a new staff dining building. The Buttes Area Council and the Mount Lassen Area Council were merged back into the Golden Empire Council, located in Sacramento, in 1993.

The Golden Empire Council closed the Glacial Trails Scout Ranch in 2003 and 2004 when they were unable to pay for improvements required by the Placer County health dept and the U.S. Forest Service. Robert L. Cole, President of Goodwin-Cole Company, contributed $260,000 in a matching grant to help pay for the necessary upgrades. The camp was reopened as a high-adventure camp in 2005. After 53 years as the Glacial Trails Scout Ranch, the camp was renamed as Camp Robert L. Cole on July 21, 2007 to honor contributions made to the council and camp by Cole. The Cole family continued to support the camp and facilities through its closure as a council summer camp in 2015.

Weather 

Due to the camp's altitude, snow may be present in camp during June and even July. On one July 4th weekend, Scout camp staff had to ski over  snow drifts to access the camp, and the summer camp program was cancelled until mid August. During most years, the camp is accessible and free of snow by about July 1. The weather during summer camp season typically ranges from 56-94 °F. It rains an average of ½ inch during July.

In popular media 

The camp had a mountain biking program during the 1980s that was featured in an article in Boys' Life magazine in May 1989.

See also 

 Tahoe National Forest

References 

Tahoe National Forest
Robert L. Cole
Robert L. Cole
Buildings and structures in Nevada County, California